Marie Lundquist (born 1950) is a Swedish author, cultural journalist and translator. She is a former high school teacher at Biskops-Arnö.

Bibliography 
1992 – Jag går runt och samlar in min trädgård för natten
1993 – Brev till de sovande
1995 – Astrakanerna
1997 – Istället för minne
1999 – En fabel skriven på stenar
2002 – En enkel berättelse
2005 – Monolog för en ensam kvinna
2007 – Drömmen om verkligheten – fotografiska reflektioner
2008 – De dödas bok
2013 – Så länge jag kan minnas har jag varit ensam

Awards 
1993 – Stig Carlson-priset
1995 – Tidningen Vi:s litteraturpris
1996 – Guldprinsen
1997 – De Nios Vinterpris
1999 – Karin Boyes litterära pris
2000 – Gerard Bonniers lyrikpris
2002 – Sveriges Radios Lyrikpris
2008 – De Nios lyrikpris
2013 – Stipendium ur Lena Vendelfelts minnesfond
2015 – Aspenströmpriset

References 

1950 births
Living people
Swedish writers